The primary texts of Kabbalah were allegedly once part of an ongoing oral tradition. The written texts are obscure and difficult for readers who are unfamiliar with Jewish spirituality which assumes extensive knowledge of the Tanakh (Hebrew Bible), Midrash (Jewish hermeneutic tradition) and halakha (Jewish religious law).

The Torah
For kabbalists, ten utterances in Genesis with which God created the world are linked to the ten sefirot—the divine structure of all being. According to the Zohar and the Sefer ha-Yihud, the Torah is synonymous with God. More specifically, in the Sefer ha-Yihud, the letters in the Torah are the forms of God. The kabbalist looks beyond the literal aspects of the text, to find the hidden mystical meaning.  The text not only offers traditions and ways of thinking, but it also reveals the reality of God. One of the first Jewish philosophers, Philo of Alexandria (20BCE-40), said that Abraham knew the essential Torah, before it was given, because Abraham was himself a philosopher: he observed the world around him and looked inside himself to discover the laws of nature.  While this is not strictly speaking a mystical notion, it does introduce the idea of an inner Torah that underlies the written word. Much later, in the 19th century, the Sfas Emes, a Hasidic rebbe, made the assertion that it was actually Abraham's deeds that became Torah.  The Torah is thus seen as an ongoing story played out through the lives of the Nation of Israel. The Torah is an important text because even the most minor traditions of the Kabbalah will acknowledge its aspects of the divine.

Textual antiquity

Jewish forms of esotericism existed over 2,000 years ago. Ben Sira warns against it, saying:  "You shall have no business with secret things". Nonetheless, mystical studies were undertaken and resulted in mystical literature. The first to appear within Judaism was the Apocalyptic literature of the second and first pre-Christian centuries and which contained elements that carried over to later Kabbalah. According to Josephus, such writings were in the possession of the Essenes and were jealously guarded by them against disclosure, for which they claimed a certain antiquity (see Philo, De Vita Contemplativa, iii., and Hippolytus, Refutation of all Heresies, ix. 27).

That books containing secret lore were kept hidden away by (or for) the "enlightened" is stated in 2 Esdras xiv. 45-46, where Pseudo-Ezra is told to publish the twenty-four books of the canon openly that the worthy and the unworthy may alike read, but to keep the seventy other books hidden in order to "deliver them only to such as be wise" (compare Dan. xii. 10); for in them are the spring of understanding, the fountain of wisdom, and the stream of knowledge.

Instructive for the study of the development of Jewish mysticism is the Book of Jubilees written around the time of King John Hyrcanus. It refers to mysterious writings of Jared, Cain, and Noah, and presents Abraham as the renewer, and Levi as the permanent guardian, of these ancient writings. It offers a cosmogony based upon the twenty-two letters of the Hebrew alphabet, and connected with Jewish chronology and Messianology, while at the same time insisting upon the heptad (7) as the holy number, rather than upon the decadic (10) system adopted by the later haggadists and observable in the Sefer Yetzirah. The Pythagorean idea of the creative powers of numbers and letters was shared with Sefer Yetzirah and was known in the time of the Mishnah before 200 CE.

Early elements of Jewish mysticism can be found in the non-Biblical texts of the Dead Sea Scrolls, such as the Songs of the Sabbath Sacrifice. Some parts of the Talmud and the Midrash also focus on the esoteric and mystical, particularly Hagigah 12b-14b.  Many esoteric texts, among them Hekalot Rabbati, Sefer HaBahir, Torat Hakana, Sefer P'liyah, Midrash Otiyot d'Rabbi Akiva, the Bahir, and the Zohar claim to be from the Talmudic era, though some of these works, most notably the Bahir and Zohar, are conjectured by some modern scholars to possibly be medieval works pseudepigraphically ascribed to the ancient past.

Traditional orthodoxy, however, does not agree to this. In the medieval era Jewish mysticism developed under the influence of the word-number esoteric text Sefer Yetzirah. Jewish sources attribute the book to the patriarch Abraham, though the text itself offers no claim as to authorship. This book, and especially its embryonic concept of the Sefirot, became the object of systematic study of several mystical brotherhoods which eventually came to be   called baale ha-kabbalah (בעלי הקבלה "possessors or masters of the Kabbalah").

Primary texts

Hekhalot literature
Hekhalot literature (Hekhalot, "Palaces") are not a single text. Rather, they are a genre of writings with shared characteristics. These texts primarily focus either on how to achieve a heavenly ascent through the Hekhalot and what to expect there, or on drawing down angelic spirits to interact and help the adept. There are several larger documents of the hekhalot, such as Hekhalot Rabbati, in which six of the seven palaces of God are described, Hekhalot Zutarti, Shi'ur Qomah and sixth-century 3 Enoch, as well as hundreds of small documents, many little more than fragments.

Sefer Yetzirah

Sefer Yetzira (סֵפֶר יְצִירָה) ("Book [of] Formation/Creation"), also known as Hilkhot Yetzira ("Laws of Formation"), is a primary source of Kabbalistic teaching. The first commentaries on this small book were written in the 10th century, perhaps the text itself is quoted as early as the 6th century, and perhaps its linguistic organization of the Hebrew alphabet could be from as early as the 2nd century. Its historical origins remain obscure, although many believe that it was authored by Abraham and edited by Rabbi Akiva. It exists today in a number of editions, up to 2,500 words long (about the size of a pamphlet). It organizes the cosmos into "32 Paths of Wisdom", comprising "10 Sefirot" (3 elements – air, water and fire – plus 6 directions and center) and "22 letters" of the Hebrew alphabet (3 mother letters, 7 double letters plus 12 simple letters). It uses this structure to organize cosmic phenomena ranging from the seasons of the calendar to the emotions of the intellect, and is essentially an index of cosmic correspondences.

Bahir
Bahir (בהיר) ("Illumination"), also known as Midrash of Rabbi Nehunya ben Ha-Kana - a book of special interest to students of Kabbalah because it serves as a kind of epitome that surveys the essential concepts of the subsequent literature of Kabbalah. It is about 12,000 words (about the size of a magazine). Despite its name "Illumination", it is notoriously cryptic and difficult to understand (but not impossible). Much of it is written in parables, one after the other. The Bahir opens with a quote attributed to Rabbi Nehunya ben Ha-Kana, a Talmudic sage of the 1st century, and the rest of the book is an unfolding discussion about the quote. Jewish tradition considers the whole book to be written in the spirit of Rabbi Nehunya (or even literally written by him). It was first published in Provence France (near Italy) in 1176. Historians suspect Rabbi Yitzhak Ha-Ivver (Isaac the Blind) wrote the book at this time, albeit he incorporated oral traditions from a much earlier time about the Tanakh, Talmud, Siddur, Yetzira, and other Rabbinic texts.

Sefer Raziel HaMalakh
Sefer Raziel HaMalakh (רזיאל המלאך) (Book of Raziel the Angel) is a collection of esoteric writings, probably compiled and edited by the same hand, but originally not the work of one author.

Leopold Zunz ("G. V." 2d ed., p. 176) distinguishes three main parts: (1) the Book Ha-Malbush; (2) the Great Raziel; (3) the Book of Secrets, or the Book of Noah. These three parts are still distinguishable—2b–7a, 7b–33b, 34a and b. After these follow two shorter parts entitled "Creation" and "Shi'ur Ḳomah," and after 41a come formulas for amulets and incantations.

Sefer ha-ḥesheq
Sefer ha-ḥesheq ( "Book of Delight"), a kabbalistic treatise dealing with the Divine names and their efficacy in mystical practices. Passed down by Abraham Abulafia, the information distinguishes between the various methods of kabbalistic transmission to later generations. Abulafia opposes the method he received to the Talmudic and theosophical Sefirotic methods.

Zohar
Zohar (זהר) ("Splendor") – the most important text of Kabbalah, at times achieving even canonical status as part of Oral Torah. It is a mystical commentary on the Torah, written in an artificial mixture of several Aramaic dialects, like the Babylonian Targumic Aramaic of Targum Onkelos, Babylonian Talmudic Aramaic, and Jewish Palestinian Aramaic.

Gershom Scholem argued that Moses de León (1240-1305) was the sole author of the Zohar. More recently, Yehuda Liebes contended that while De León may have been the primary author, he incorporated or recast selections from contemporary kabbalists (e.g. Rabbi Joseph Gikatilla, Rabbi Joseph of Hamadan, Rabbi Bahya ben Asher). Most recently, Kabbalah scholars such as Ronit Meroz, Daniel Abrams and Boaz Huss have been demonstrating that the materials within the Zohar underwent several generations of writing, re-writing and redaction. De León claimed to discover the text of the Zohar while in the land of Israel and attributed it to the 2nd-century Rabbi Shimon bar Yohai, who is the main character of the text. The text gained enormous popularity throughout the Jewish world.

Though the book was widely accepted, a small number of significant rabbis over the subsequent centuries published texts declaring Rabbi Moshe invented it as a forgery with concepts contrary to Judaism. However, many of these Rabbis were not Kabbalists themselves. This was a major point of contention made by a community among the Jews of Yemen, known as Dor Daim, a religious intellectual movement that called for a return to a more Talmudic based Judaism. Other communities in Italy and the Andalusian (Spanish Portuguese) lands also questioned the content and authenticity of the Zohar. While organized into commentaries on sections of the Torah, the Zohar elaborates on the Talmud, Midrash Rabba, Sefer Yetzira, the Bahir, and many other Rabbinic texts. To some degree, the Zohar simply is Kabbalah.

Pardes Rimonim

Pardes Rimonim (in Hebrew: פרדס רימונים) (Garden [of] Pomegranates) – the magnum opus of Rabbi Moshe Cordovero (1522–1570), published in the 16th century. It is the main source of Cordoverian Kabbalah, a comprehensive interpretation of the Zohar and a friendly rival of the Lurianic interpretation.

Etz Hayim and the Eight Gates

Etz Hayim (in Hebrew: עץ חיים) ("Tree [of] Life") is a text of the teachings of Isaac Luria collected by his disciple Chaim Vital. It is the primary interpretation and synthesis of Lurianic Kabbalah. It was first published in Safed in the 16th century. It consists of the primary introduction to the remainder of the Lurianic system. The Shemona She'arim (eight gates): is the full Lurianic system as arranged by Shmuel Vital, the son of Haim Vital. Eitz Hayim is the only work published within Hayim Vital's lifetime, the rest of his writings were buried with him in an unedited form. Supposedly Shmuel Vital had a dream that he was to exhume his father's grave and remove certain writings leaving the others buried. Shmuel Vital went on then to redact and publish the works as the Eight Gates which are then, at times subdivided into other works:

 Shaar HaHakdamot – Gate of Introduction: Otztrot Haim, Eitz Haim, Arbah Meot Shekel Kesef, Mavoa Shaarim, Adam Yashar
 Shaar Mamri RaShB"Y – Gate Words of R.Simeon bar Yochai
 Shaar Mamri RaZ"L – Gate Words of Our Sages
 Shaar HaMitzvot – Gate of Mitzvot commandments
 Shaar HaPasukim – Gate of Verses: Likutei Torah, Sepher HaLikutim
 Shaar HaKavanot – Gate of Kavanot (intentions): Shaar HaKavvanot, Pri Eitz Haim, Olat Tamid
 Shaar Ruach HaKodesh – Gate of Prophetic Spirit
 Shaar HaGilgulim – Gate of Gilgul reincarnations

Sephardi and Mizrahi Kabbalists endeavor to study all eight gates. Etz Hayim is published standard in a single volume three part arrangement, the initial two parts published by Haim Vital, with a third part, Nahar Shalom by Rabbi Shalom Sharabi, being now considered the third part. Ashkenazi Kabbalists often tend to focus only on Eitz Haim, with explanations of the RaMHaL (Rabbi Moshe Haim Luzzato). However this is not always the case. There are Yeshivot such as Shaar Shmayim that deal with the works of Haim Vital in their entirety.

Notes

References

  Dan, Joseph, The Early Jewish Mysticism, Tel Aviv: MOD Books, 1993.
  __, The 'Unique Cherub' Circle, Tübingen: J.C.B. Mohr, 1999.
  Dan, Joseph and Kiener, Ron, The Early Kabbalah, Mahwah, N.J.: Paulist Press, 1986.
  Dennis, G., The Encyclopedia of Jewish Myth, Magic, and Mysticism, St. Paul: Llewellyn Worldwide, 2007.
  Fine, L., ed., Essential Papers in Kabbalah, New York: NYU Press, 1995.
  Idel, Moshe. Kabbalah: New Perspectives. New Haven and London: Yale University Press, 1988.
  _, Kabbalah: New Perspectives, New Haven: Yale Press, 1988.
   _, "The Story of Rabbi Joseph della Reina," in Behayahu, M., Studies and Texts on the History of the Jewish Community in Safed.
. __, "Defining Kabbalah: The Kabbalah of the Divine Names", in Herrera, R.A., Mystics of the Book, New York, 1993.
  Kaplan, Aryeh Inner Space: Introduction to Kabbalah, Meditation and Prophecy. Moznaim Publishing Corp 1990.
  __, The Bahir, trans. Aryeh Kaplan, Aronson, 1995.
  __,The Sefer Yetzirah, the Book of Creation: in Theory and Practice, trans. Aryeh Kaplan, Samuel Weiser, Inc., 1997.
  John W. McGinley,  'The Written' as the Vocation of Conceiving Jewishly;  
  Scholem, Gershom, Kabbalah, Jewish Publication Society.
  Wineberg, Yosef. Lessons in Tanya: The Tanya of R. Shneur Zalman of Liadi (5 volume set). Merkos L'Inyonei Chinuch, 1998. 
  The Wisdom of The Zohar: An Anthology of Texts, 3 volume set, Ed. Isaiah Tishby, translated from the Hebrew by David Goldstein, The Littman Library.

Online bibliographies and study guides
  Don Karr's Bibliographic Surveys
  A Guide to English Language Resources for the Student of Traditional Rabbinic Kabbalah

Online rabbinic Kabbalah texts
  Who Should Learn the Hidden Torah? Rambam (pdf)(Maimonides) Guide for the Perplexed
  English and Aramaic Zohar Online (searchable) – Kabbalah Centre
  Kabbalah Digital Library (Responsa-like searchable) – Bnei Baruch
  Seforim/Hebrew books

Online Hasidic Kabbalah texts
 Lessons in Tanya – Chabad
 The Gate Of Unity Translation & Commentary of The Gate Of Unity